Colin Wilson (born 23 May 1969) is a former rugby union and professional rugby league footballer who played in the 1990s and 2000s.

International honours
Colin Wilson won caps for Scotland (RL) while at Linlithgow Lions 1998 2-caps (sub).

1988 and 1989 Ulster U20 XV trialist, centre.
1995 Glasgow District Union representative XV, wing.
1996 Edinburgh District Union representative XV, wing.
1997 Edinburgh District Union representative XV, wing.
1997 Captain of inaugural Scotland amateur XIII, prop.
1998 Captain of Scotland amateur XIII, prop.
1998 Played for Scotland professional XIII, prop.
1999 Trialist and signed for Hull Kingston Rovers RLFC, prop.
2002 Scotland amateur XIII, loose forward.

References

External links
Search for "Wilson" at espn.co.uk

1969 births
Edinburgh Rugby players
Fife Lions players
Glasgow District (rugby union) players
Hull Kingston Rovers players
Linlithgow Lions players
Living people
Place of birth missing (living people)
Rugby league locks
Rugby league props
Rugby league second-rows
Rugby union centres
Rugby union wings
Scotland national rugby league team players